Genève-Champel railway station is a railway station in the municipality of Geneva, in the Swiss canton of Geneva. It is an intermediate stop on the standard gauge CEVA orbital railway line of Swiss Federal Railways. The station opened in December 2019 as part of the launch of the new Léman Express network. During the planning and development process the station was known as Champel-Hôpital.

Services 
The following services stop at Genève-Champel:

References

External links 
 
 

Railway stations in the canton of Geneva
Swiss Federal Railways stations
Railway stations in Switzerland opened in 2019